Peter Vernon Harvey (6 January 1926 – 27 October 1966) was an English cricketer.  Harvey was a left-handed batsman.  He was born at Wallington, Surrey.

While studying at University College, Oxford, Harvey made a single first-class appearance for Oxford University Cricket Club against the Free Foresters in 1949.  In this match, he was dismissed for 9 runs in the university's only innings by Rowland Shaddick, with Oxford University winning by an innings and 17 runs.

He died on 27 October 1966 just outside Taunton, Somerset.

References

External links
Peter Harvey at ESPNcricinfo
Peter Harvey at CricketArchive

1926 births
1966 deaths
People from Wallington, London
English cricketers
Alumni of University College, Oxford
Oxford University cricketers